The Jacob B. Van Wagener Barn is lava rock structure built in 1912.  It located in Jerome, Idaho, United States, and was listed on the National Register of Historic Places in 1983.

The Jacob B. Van Wagener Caretaker's House is also listed on the National Register.

See also
 List of National Historic Landmarks in Idaho
 National Register of Historic Places listings in Jerome County, Idaho

References

1912 establishments in Idaho
Barns on the National Register of Historic Places in Idaho
Buildings and structures completed in 1912
Buildings and structures in Jerome County, Idaho
National Register of Historic Places in Jerome County, Idaho
Lava rock buildings and structures